Nuran may refer to:

People
 Rüştü Nuran (born 1976), Turkish basketball referee and surgeon
 Nuran Tanrıverdi, Turkish architect and pain
 KA Nuran (born 1991) Kuwait and paint

Places
 Nuran, Azerbaijan
 Nuran, Ardabil, Iran
 Nuran, Khuzestan, Iran